Dunhua Road, consists of Dunhua North Road and Dunhua South Road, also called 12th Ave, is a major north–south arterial in Taipei, Taiwan. It connects the Songshan Airport and the Songshan District in the north with the Daan District in the south, near the National Taiwan University. Dunhua Road is known as one of Taipei's more beautiful arterials, mainly because of the large, landscaped medians dividing the express and local lanes of the arterial. The arterial channels traffic coming to and from Songshan Airport throughout Taipei. Dunhua Road is divided into north and south sections (as determined by Bade Road), with two numbered sections in the south and no numbered sections in the north.

Attractions
Notable attractions along Dunhua Road includes:
 Taipei Arena
 Asiaworld Department Store (IKEA)
 SOGO
 Eslite Department Store
 Taipei Metro Mall
 Chang-Gung Memorial Hospital
 Shiatzy Chen Dun Nan Store
 RIMOWA Taiwan Flagship Store (Largest RIMOWA luggage shop in the world)

Major Intersections

Dunhua North Road 
 Minquan East Road
 Minsheng East Road
 Nanjing East Road
 Bade Road

Dunhua South Road 
 Bade Road
 Civic Blvd.
 Zhongxiao East Road
 Renai Road
 Xinyi Road
 Heping Road
 Keelung Road

See also

 List of roads in Taiwan

Streets in Taipei